C'est la vie is a Swedish language song written by Thomas G:son, and originally performed by Ann-Louise Hanson, Towa Carson and Siw Malmkvist at Melodifestivalen 2004.

Charts
The song peaked at 33rd position at the Swedish singles chart. It was tested for Svensktoppen, and on 25 April 2004 it entered 7th position. The song's Svensktoppen visit lasted for three weeks, peaking at 6th position on 2 May 2004.

In popular culture
 The song was often used during the TV3 s reality TV show Club Goa.

Charts

References

External links
 Information at Svensk mediedatabas

2004 singles
Melodifestivalen songs of 2004
Siw Malmkvist songs
Swedish-language songs
Songs written by Thomas G:son
Ann-Louise Hanson songs
Towa Carson songs
2004 songs